Faradic may refer to:
 Michael Faraday (1791–1867)
 A form of electricity, named after Faraday